The Anchorage earthquake may refer to:

 1964 Anchorage earthquake
 2018 Anchorage earthquake